Andy LeRoy (born June 24, 1975) is an American former alpine skier and trainer who competed in the 1998 Winter Olympics.

LeRoy, 45, returns to the University of Colorado Boulder (CU Boulder), from the University of Denver, where he led the alpine team and was the head coach for the past 15 seasons. During his tenure at DU he led the Pioneers to six NCAA championships.

He also appeared on season three of The Bachelorette, but failed to receive a rose in the season premier.

References

External links
 

1975 births
Living people
American male alpine skiers
Olympic alpine skiers of the United States
Alpine skiers at the 1998 Winter Olympics
20th-century American people